Shattered Memories may refer to:

Silent Hill: Shattered Memories, a 2009 survival horror video game
Shattered Memories (film), a 2018 American thriller film